Noha Safwat Hafez Abd Rabo (born January 2, 1987) is an Egyptian taekwondo practitioner. Abd Rabo qualified for the women's heavyweight class (+67 kg) at the 2008 Summer Olympics in Beijing, after winning the championship title from the African Qualification Tournament in Tripoli, Libya. She lost the preliminary round of sixteen match to Norway's Nina Solheim, with a score of 3–9. Because her opponent advanced further into the final match, Abd Rabo took advantage of the repechage round by defeating Malaysia's Che Chew Chan. She progressed to the bronze medal match, but narrowly lost the medal to Great Britain's Sarah Stevenson, with a score of 1–5.

References

External links

NBC Olympics Profile

Egyptian female taekwondo practitioners
1987 births
Living people
Olympic taekwondo practitioners of Egypt
Taekwondo practitioners at the 2008 Summer Olympics